Francis Mwahza is a Zambian judoka. He competed in the men's half-lightweight event at the 1980 Summer Olympics.

References

Year of birth missing (living people)
Living people
Zambian male judoka
Olympic judoka of Zambia
Judoka at the 1980 Summer Olympics
Place of birth missing (living people)